Rowland Joseph Anderson (30 September 1872 – 29 August 1959) was an Australian politician.

He was born in Kurrajong to farmer William James Anderson and Sarah Roberts. He attended public school at Parramatta but left at sixteen to work as a tanner at Smithfield. On 16 September 1896 he married Minnie Maud Critchley; they had four children. In 1896 he established his own tannery business in Botany, and in 1904 was elected a local alderman. Also in 1904, he was elected to the New South Wales Legislative Assembly as the Liberal member for Botany. He did not re-contest in 1907. From 1929 to 1931 he was federal president of the Master Tanners Association; he was also deputy chair of the federal Hide and Leather Industries Board during both world wars.

References

 

1872 births
1959 deaths
Members of the New South Wales Legislative Assembly